is a dam in Kawanishi, Hyōgo Prefecture, Japan.

References 

Dams in Hyogo Prefecture
Dams completed in 1983